Francesco De Angelis may refer to:

 Francesco De Angelis (musician) (born 1971), Italian violinist
 Francesco de Angelis (sailor) (born 1960), Italian yachtsman
 Francesco De Angelis (politician)